Koo Jeong A is a South-Korean born and Paris-based mixed-media and installation artist.

Koo studied at the Ecole des Beaux-Arts in Paris. She worked as an artist-in-residence in the Augarten Contemporary in 2002.

Her work has included still and moving images, sound and scent, found objects, the natural environment, and site-specific installation. 
The New York Times referred to her work as having diverse influences and themes of childhood longing. Art in America called her work "focused", "quiet", and "quirky."

Select exhibitions
Visibilities: Intrepid Women of Artpace, Artpace, San Antonio, Texas (2020)
Galerie Eva Presenhuber, New York (2020)
OooOoO, La Triennale di Milano, Milano (2019)
Don't look like a line, Pinksummer temporary venue, Hangar Toolbox, Via Egeo, Turin (2017)
ajeongkoo, Art Sonje Center, Seoul (2017)
Arrogation, 32nd São Paulo Biennial, São Paulo (2016)
'Odorama', Art Night with Institute of Contemporary Arts, London (2016)
14th Venice Biennale of Architecture, Swiss Pavilion (2014)
 10th Gwangju Biennale (2014)
The Oussser (2014), La Raia Fondazione
do it 2013, Manchester Art Gallery (2013)
Koo Jeong-A (2012), Kunsthalle Düsseldorf
20 (2012), Pinksummer
Constellation Congress, Dia:Beacon (2010)
53rd Venice Biennale (2009)
Your Bright Future: 12 Contemporary Artists from Korea (2009), Los Angeles County Museum of Art
Koo Jeong A, Aspen Art Museum (2007)
Singular Forms (Sometimes Repeated), Solomon R. Guggenheim Museum (2004)

Recognition
In 2016, she was named "2016 Artist of the Year" by the Korean Cultural Centre UK.

In 2005 she was awarded the Hermès Korea Missulsang prize.

In 2002, Koo was a finalist for the Hugo Boss Prize at the Solomon R. Guggenheim Museum.

Public collections
Koo's work may be found in several public institutions, including:

Solomon R. Guggenheim Museum
Centre Pompidou
Tate Modern
Astrup Fearnley Museum of Modern Art
RISD Museum
Louis Vuitton Foundation for Creation
Musée d'Art Moderne de la Ville de Paris
Frac fond régional d'art contemporain, Marseille, France
FNAC (Fonds national d'art contemporain), Paris

Publications
Constellation Congress: Koo Jeong A. New Haven: Yale University Press (2012). 
Otro: Koo Jeong A. Vassiviere: Le Centre International d'Art et du Paysage (2012). 
9 Nove/Nine: Koo Jeong A. Lisbon: Fundacao Calouste Gulbenkian (2011). 
Oussseux Milan: Silvana Editions (2010). 
Flammariousss: Koo Jeong A & Edouard Glissant Paris: Yvon Lambert (2006).
Koo Jeong-A : 315 n° 1 Paris: Editions du Centre Pompidou (2004). 
Frozen With A Smile: Koo Jeong A. Kitayushu: Silvana Editions (2010). 
The Land of Ousss Dublin: Douglas Hyde Gallery (2002). Ireland 
Koo Jeong A. Paris: Editions des musees de la Ville de Paris (1997). 
Migrateurs: Koo Jeong A. Paris: ARC Musee d'Art Moderne de la Ville de Paris (1994).

See also
Installation art

External links
Koo Jeong A at Pilar Corrias, London
Koo Jeong A at Pinksummer Gallery, Genova

References

Installation artists
South Korean expatriates in Germany
South Korean expatriates in the United Kingdom
1967 births
Living people
South Korean contemporary artists
South Korean women artists